The 2002 XXXVIII FIBA International Christmas Tournament "Trofeo Raimundo Saporta-Memorial Fernando Martín" was the 38th edition of the FIBA International Christmas Tournament. It took place at Raimundo Saporta Pavilion, Madrid, Spain, on 25 December 2002 with the participations of Real Madrid and Maccabi Tel Aviv.

Final

December 25, 2002

|}

References

FIBA International Christmas Tournament
2002–03 in European basketball
2002–03 in Israeli basketball
2002–03 in Spanish basketball